Wilfried Hiller (born 15 March 1941) is a German composer. He became known above all for his stage works for families, children and young people.

Life and work 
Hiller was born the son of the teacher August Hiller and his wife Josepha Hiller, née Hauser, in the Swabian town of Weißenhorn near Ulm. In 1944, the year of the war, his father was killed in Russia and Wilfried became a half-orphan at the age of three.  Hiller himself described early childhood experiences in connection with his composition Alkor thus:

Training 
From 1958 to 1961, Hiller wrote his first play with music (Die Räuber von Hiller) as well as piano compositions and chamber music and worked as an organist and ballet répétiteur.

From 1962, he took part in the Darmstädter Ferienkurse for Neue Musik and was a guest student of Pierre Boulez, Bruno Maderna and Karlheinz Stockhausen. During this time he also became acquainted with his later publisher Peter Hanser-Strecker and the composer Karl Amadeus Hartmann. At Hartmann's suggestion, Hiller began studying music at the Hochschule für Musik und Theater München in 1963. Here he studied music composition with Günter Bialas, opera direction with Heinz Arnold, percussion and timpani with Ludwig Porth and Hanns Hölzl, and music theory with Hermann Pfrogner.

As Hiller made known in 2013, he was a victim of sexual abuse at Seminar St. Joseph of the Stephan-Gymnasium.

From 1967 Hiller worked as a percussionist in various orchestras, such as the Bavarian Radio Symphony Orchestra, the Bavarian State Opera and the Staatstheater am Gärtnerplatz. In 1968, he founded the concert series "Musik unserer Zeit".

In 1968 he met Carl Orff, who strongly influenced him in the following years. Hiller worked closely with Orff as his student until his death in 1982 and has chaired the Carl Orff Foundation since 2008.

Hiller's works for music theatre were decisively influenced by his collaboration with his wife, the actress Elisabet Woska, from 1971 onwards.

Collaboration with Michael Ende 
His meeting with the writer Michael Ende in 1978 marked the beginning of a fruitful artistic partnership and close friendship that lasted until Ende's death in 1995 and led to a whole series of successful stage works such as Tranquilla Trampeltreu, Der Goggolori and Das Traumfresserchen.

Hiller has a special relationship with compositions for children and young people. In an interview on the occasion of his 60th birthday, he answered the question of how he manages as a composer to appeal equally to children and adults:

 "By simply writing for the child that you have remained yourself... The decisive factor for success is that you get to the point musically, and how the children react, whether they go along enthusiastically – or whether they are bored. Children can be merciless judges." 

Hiller considers young listeners and viewers to be self-confident and intelligent and does not want to bore them with a reduced theme or tonal language – neither the multi-layered and dense, yet easily comprehensible libretti Michael Ende's nor his music are "simple" in this sense.

One hundred percent understanding of the text and a clear message are important when composing for children, according to Hiller. The turtle Tranquilla Trampeltreu in the musical fable of the same name, for example, is rewarded for her stubbornness, perseverance and self-discipline despite her unpunctuality – she arrives a whole generation too late for the royal wedding of the lion Leo XXVIII.

Hiller also thinks that musical theatre works for children should definitely contain passages that can be remembered:

"Earworm melodies should be allowed, even though they are considered taboo and people look crossly at you [if you write them]. But there is something to this sentence by Darius Milhaud: "He who cannot write a melody that one can remember cannot be called a composer."

According to Hiller's and Ende's experience, the performance duration of a  should not exceed 80 to 85 minutes.

After Ende's death, Hiller first worked with Herbert Asmodi (The Story of the Little Blue Mountain Lake and the Old Eagle), then, since 1997, with Rudolf Herfurtner. He also drew on literary models by Theodor Storm (The Rider on the White Horse), Christian Morgenstern (Heidenröslein) and Wilhelm Busch (Der Geigenseppel). In addition to the numerous stage works, there are also a large number of chamber musical works, concertos, choir and orchestral works.

By his own account, Hiller is the most frequently performed living German stage composer. His works for children and young people in particular fill a gap in the repertoire, as musically complex children's operas that are nevertheless popular with children are rare, but are urgently needed by the growing number of children's opera projects in the context of increased youth work in opera houses. His works are therefore performed in numerous productions in German-speaking countries. For example, a production of Traumfresserchen was shown in the children's opera tent on the roof of the Vienna State Opera for several seasons to a consistently sold-out audience.

Hiller's church opera Augustinus – Ein klingendes Mosaik about St Augustine premiered in Munich on 19 March 2005.

From 2009, Hiller took over as the new artistic director of the Internationale Orgelwoche Nürnberg (ION). He continues to be artistic director of the Diabelli-Contest, an international composers' competition.

Music editor and sound engineer 
In addition to his work as a freelance composer, Hiller worked as a music editor and sound engineer at the Bayerischer Rundfunk from November 1971 to March 2006. At first, his programmes included upmarket light music and, from 1974, symphonic music; later he was editor for special programmes. In addition, he founded the series musik unserer zeit, from which the Münchner Musiknächte later emerged, as well as the festival Orff in Andechs.

As an editor at Bayerischer Rundfunk, he was responsible for the following series, among others:
 Münchner Musikgeschichte in Straßennamen
 Dirigenten bei der Probe
 Musik meiner Wahl
 Komponisten machen Programm
 außereuropäische Musik
 musik unserer zeit
 Nachtakzente
 Concerto bavarese
 Festival traditioneller Musik

Hiller is on the board of the Jean Sibelius Society and the Kulturkreis Gasteig. In 1989, he became a member of the Bavarian Academy of Fine Arts, and in 1993 he was appointed composition teacher at the Richard Strauss Conservatory Munich. Numerous of his students have obtained scholarships there (Nélida Béjar, Dieter Dolezel, Christoph Garbe, Eva Sindichakis, Markus Zahnhausen).

Work

Stage work 
Operas and other works for music theatre:
 An diesem heutigen Tage (premiere 9 January 1974 on ZDF), monodrama for actress and percussion, libretto: Elisabet Woska after Mary Stuart's letters
 Niobe (1978), in ancient Greek
 Ijob (premiere 15 July 1979, Theater im Marstall, München), monodrama for tenor, based on the biblical Book of Job in the translation by Martin Buber; 2nd version: premiere 22 February 1984, Französische Kirche, Bern
 Liebestreu und Grausamkeit (1981), after Wilhelm Busch
 Der Goggolori. Eine bairische Mär mit Musik (premiere 3 February 1985, Theater am Gärtnerplatz, Munich), libretto in bavarian by Michael Ende
 Vervollständigung von Chaplin-Ford-Trott from the Wachsfigurenkabinett by Karl Amadeus Hartmann (1988)
 Die Jagd nach dem Schlarg (1988), libretto: Michael Ende after Lewis Carroll
 Der Rattenfänger (1993), libretto: Michael Ende
 Die Geschichte vom kleinen blauen Bergsee und dem alten Adler (1996), libretto: Herbert Asmodi
 Heidenröslein (1996), after Christian Morgenstern and Johannes Brahms
 Der Schimmelreiter (1998), libretto by Andreas K. W. Meyer after Theodor Storm
 Eduard auf dem Seil (1998), libretto: Rudolf Herfurtner – Opera about Eduard Mörike
 Der Geigenseppel (2000), melodrama for puppets after Wilhelm Busch's poem (Text by Elisabet Woska), commissioned by the cultural programme in the German Pavilion at the World's Fair Expo 2000 in Hannover
 Wolkenstein (premiere 6 March 2004, Opera Nürnberg, director: Percy Adlon) – Opera about Oswald von Wolkenstein
 Augustinus – Ein klingendes Mosaik (premiere 19 March 2005, St. Luke's Church, Munich – Church opera about St Augustine, text: Winfried Böhm.
 Der Sohn des Zimmermanns (premiere 16 March 2010, Würzburg Cathedral – Church opera about Jesus, text: Winfried Böhm, dramaturgical collaboration: Elisabet Woska.
 Momo (premiere 2018, Staatstheater am Gärtnerplatz, Munich), libretto by Wolfgang Adenberg

Music theatre for children and young people:
 Vier musikalische Fabeln nach Texten von Michael Ende, szenisch oder als Hörspiel aufzuführen
 Der Lindwurm und der Schmetterling oder Der seltsame Tausch (1980, premiere 11 January 1981, Theater am Haidplatz des Stadttheaters Regensburg)
 Tranquilla Trampeltreu, die beharrliche Schildkröte (premiere 9 July 1981, Stadtmuseum München)
 Die Ballade von Norbert Nackendick oder Das Nackte Nashorn (premiere 23 September 1982, Rheinisches Marionettentheater, Düsseldorf)
 Die Fabel von Filemon Faltenreich oder Die Fußballweltmeisterschaft der Fliegen (premiere)
 Die zerstreute Brillenschlange (1981) for narrator, clarinet and drone, text: Michael Ende
 Josa mit der Zauberfiedel (1985)
 Das Traumfresserchen (premiere 5 February 1991, Theater Bremen), libretto: Michael Ende
 Peter Pan (1997), after J. M. Barrie
 Die Waldkinder (1997–1998), "Taschenoper", libretto: Rudolf Herfurtner
 Pinocchio (premiere 12 October 2002), after the novel Pinocchio by Carlo Collodi
 Momo (premiere 16 December 2018, Staatstheater am Gärtnerplatz Munich), after the eponymous novel by Michael Ende.

Stage Music and Music for Puppet Theatre:
 Die Räuber von Hiller (1975)
 Wunschpunsch (1990)
 Das Gauklermärchen (1998)
 Momo (2002)

Vocal work 
 Der Leuchtturm (1962–1963) for aaritono and Hammered dulcimer, Neubearbeitung 1997
 Let Thy Song Be Love (1969) for soprano and piano
 Schulamit (1977–1990) for solo singer, choir and orchestra
 Muspilli (1978) for baritone and instruments
 Ein Frosch sah einstmals einen Stier (1979), for solo singers, choir and orchestra
 Trödelmarkt der Träume (1984), song cycle
 Klangbaustelle Klimperton (1996), music for school radio broadcasts
 Sappho-Fragmente' (1997) for girls' choir, flute and cello
 Merseburger Zaubersprüche (1997) for children's choir and brass, setting of the Merseburger Zaubersprüche
 Servietten-Haiku (1997) for soprano and chamber ensemble.
 Aias (2001) for mezzo-soprano, baritone, narrator and orchestra
 Heilige Nacht (2001) for male sextet, speaker and instruments
 Michael-Ende-Liederbuch (2002) for girls' choir, cello and percussion
 Gilgamesh (2002) for baritone and instruments, after the Epic of Gilgamesh

Orchestral work 
 Fanfare (1970) for trumpets, timpani and bass drum
 Nachtgesang (1974)
 München (1990), Suite
 Hintergründige Gedanken des erzbischöflichen Compositeurs Heinrich Ignaz Franz Biber beim Belauschen eines Vogelkonzertes (1991)
 Chagall-Zyklus (1993) for clarinet and chamber orchestra
 Pegasus 51 (1995) for jazz percussion and symphony orchestra
 Fanfare (1996) for brass and timpani
 Enigma Canon (2000), arrangement after Johann Sebastian Bach
 Via Dolorosa (2001)
 Bavariations (2002)
 Tarot XVI (2002) for strings and zither
 Cappella Sistina (2009) Roman frescoes for orchestra, soprano and Quartetto lontano

Chamber music 
 Movements for a Big Cat (1968) for oboe and bassoon
 Pas de deux (1978) for two pianos
 Natura morta con saltiero (1983), quintet
 Lilith (1987) for four strings and piano
 Notenbüchlein für Tamino (1990) for eight flutes
 Niobe (1995), piano trio
 Devil's Toccata (1995) for violin and four percussionists
 Liocorno di Bomarzo (1997) for organ and alphorn
 Book of Stars (from 1999) for one, two or three pianos
 Duetti amorosi (2000/2001) for octet
 Der Tod ist eine schöne Frau (2000) for violin and piano

Solo pieces 
 Elegy (1966) for oboe
 Rhythmizomenon (1966) for piano
 Katalog für Schlagzeug I-V (1966–1975)
 Phantasy (1982) for piano after a cycle of pictures by Wilhelm Busch
 Toccata diabolica (1993) for organ
 Scherzo (1994) for cello
 Toccata cabbalistica sopra la-sol (1994) for organ
 Tarot XVI (2002) for organ
 Ophelia (2003) for violin

Awards 
 1968: Richard-Strauss-Preis der Stadt Munich
 1971: 
 1977: Brünner Preis, Anerkennungspreis der Stadt Salzburg für sein Werk Niobe
 1978: Stipendiat der Deutschen Akademie Rom Villa Massimo
 1978: Schwabing Art Prize für Musik
 1988: Raiffeisen-Förderpreis
 1997: Werner-Egk-Preis, Kunstpreis der Stadt Donauwörth
 2000: Bayerischer Poetentaler, Literatenpreis der 
 2008: Bayerischer Verdienstorden
 2010: Bayerischer Maximiliansorden für Wissenschaft und Kunst
 2013: Oberbayerischer Kulturpreis

Further reading 
 Richard Braun among others: Harenberg, Komponisten-Lexikon. 760 Komponisten und ihr Werk. Harenberg, Dortmund 2001 , page 426f.
 Wilfried Hiller: Leben. Opus und Dokumente auf pegasus51.de.
 Gunter Reiß (ed.): Theater und Musik für Kinder. Beiträge und Quellen zu Herfurtner, Hiller, Ponsioen, Schwaen, zum Kinderschauspiel und Figurentheater. (Kinder- und Jugendkultur, -literatur und -medien. Vol. 12). Lang, Frankfurt among others. 2001, .
 Tranquilla Trampeltreu (Schallplattencover). Deutsche Grammophon Junior Stereo 2546 058, 1981.
 Gunter Reiß: Auf dem „Trödelmarkt der Träume“. Der Komponist Wilfried Hiller. Schott, Mainz 2011, .
 Andrea Grandjean-Gremminger: Oper für Kinder. Zur Gattung und ihrer Geschichte – Mit einer Fallstudie zu Wilfried Hiller (Kinder- und Jugendkultur, -literatur und -medien. Band 56). Lang, Frankfurt among others, 2008, .
 Theresa Kalin, Franzpeter Messmer (ed.): Wilfried Hiller, monograph (Komponisten in Bayern. Vol. 56). Verlag Hans Schneider, Tutzing 2014, .

Interviews:
 Bayern Alpha: Wilfried Hiller im Gespräch mit Susanne Schmerda. Weblink (PDF; 47kB)
 GEMA-Nachrichten 163: Durch Phantasie das Bewusstsein verändern. Interview with Wilfried Hiller. Weblink

References

External links 
 
 
 

20th-century classical composers
German composers
German opera composers
1941 births
Living people
People from Neu-Ulm (district)